The Raigam Tele'es Prathibha Prabha Award is presented annually in Sri Lanka by the Kingdom of Raigam for the artists who devoted their life to the improvement of Sri Lankan cinema, theatre and television.

The award was first given in 2007. The following is a list of the winners of this award since 2007.

Award list in each year

References

Awards established in 2005
2005 establishments in Sri Lanka
Sri Lankan awards